In computer networking, unicast is a one-to-one transmission from one point in the network to another point; that is, one sender and one receiver, each identified by a network address.

Unicast is in contrast to multicast and broadcast which are one-to-many transmissions.

Internet Protocol unicast delivery methods such as Transmission Control Protocol (TCP) and User Datagram Protocol (UDP) are typically used.

See also
 Anycast
 Broadcast, unknown-unicast and multicast traffic
 IP address
 IP multicast
 Routing

References

External links
 
 

Internet architecture